Aquarena, or Aquaréna, may refer to:

A former name for the Meadows Center for Water and the Environment, an educational center in San Marcos, Texas, US
, a water park near Budapest, Hungary
Aquarena (Worthing), a former swimming pool in Worthing, UK
Kyoto Aquarena, an indoor swimming pool and skating rink in Kyoto, Japan